Oriflame Miss Universe Nepal 2021,  the 2nd annual Miss Universe Nepal beauty pageant, was held on 30 October 2021 at Hotel Yak & Yeti in Kathmandu. Anshika Sharma crowned Sujita Basnet as Miss Universe Nepal to represent Nepal in Miss Universe 2021.

The winner of Miss Universe Nepal 2021 received NPR Rs. 1,000,000 as prize for winning the title as well as full support from the Miss Universe Nepal Organisation for her BBB (Brave, Bold and Beautiful) Social Advocacy.

Image Channel  broadcast the pageant live and for all the Nepalese abroad. Miss Universe Nepal 2021 was also live streamed on Youtube.

Background

Location and date
The second edition of the Miss Universe Nepal beauty contest was scheduled to be held on 30 October 2021. The press conference of the contest was conducted at the Yak & Yeti Hotel in Kathmandu, in which the Yak & Yeti Hotel in Kathmandu will be served as the venue for the close camp and the grand finale coronation.

Hosts and Performer
Like the 2020 edition, Subeksha Khadka (Miss Nepal International 2012 and World Miss University Nepal 2017) hosted everything from the Grand Final Press Presentation. As for the final however, instead of Rabi Rajkarnikar, Presca Udas hosted the event with Subeksha Khadka.

Sushant KC was the performer for the Evening Gown round.

Selection of Participants
Applications for Miss Universe Nepal started on 22 September and applications ended on 30 September. The official press presentation for Miss Universe Nepal 2021 was on 10 October 2021.

'The Mystical Crown'
A new crown will be used to award the winner of the Miss Universe Nepal pageant for the 2021 edition. The headwear is known as the "The Mystical Crown" and was crafted by Shree Balaji Diamond.

The crown was inspired from Newari architecture with aesthetics from Tibetan culture with inspriations from places of worship for Lord Bhairava and Gautama Buddha. The crown includes more than 3200 pieces of diamonds with an approximate weight of 312 carats, topped off with a playful dangling of south sea cultured pearls and kyanite stones which are locally mined and cut in Nepal.

Results 
Color keys

(●): The candidates won the Miss Popular Choice Award (online voting) and got direct entry into Top 10 Finalists.  <small>
(฿): The candidate won the Social Impact Leader Award (Best BBB (Brave, Bold and Beautiful) Social Advocacy) and got direct entry into Top 10 Finalists.

Special Awards

Miss Popular Choice 

The winner of the "Miss Popular Choice" was determined via a public paid voting on the IME Pay app with the voting page for Miss Universe Nepal or using the Miss Universe Nepal app. Both Sagun Gurung from Chitwan and Bibhuti Gautam from Jhapa automatically qualified for the top 10 finalists at the grand final round, held on 30 October in Hotel Yak & Yeti, Kathmandu.

Judges
The contestants selected their judges from the Top 10 Q&A round. The contestants selected their judge through the category of which judge they want to talk to. The theme was seasons, the judges had their selected season for judging (Spring, Summer, Fall, Winter, Monsoon and Frost).

 Mannsi Agrawal (Monsoon) - Motivational Speaker and Corporate Trainer. 
 Sareeta Shri Gyawali (Summer) - Nepali media personality
 Indira Joshi (Fall) - Nepali singer and musician
 Ishani Shrestha (Winter) - Winner of Miss Nepal 2013, Top 10 Finalist and Beauty With a Purpose Winner of Miss World 2013
 Ritu Singh Vaidya (Spring) - 1st Runner up of Femina Miss India 1991 and Top 10 Semifinalist of Miss World 1991
 Sneh Rana (Frost) - Professional Makeup Artist
|}

Contestants

Note

Previous Experience
 (#1) Anuska Adhikari was the 2nd Runner Up of Miss Teen Nepal 2016. 
 (#2) Diksha Khati was a Top 10 finalist and the winner of Miss Talent at an unnamed pageant in 2017. 
 (#3) Sapana Bhandari was the winner of Miss Tourism Ambassador Universe Nepal 2019. 
 (#4) Surabhi Kanal was the winner of Miss Nepal USA 2019.
 (#5) Nina Kant Mandal was the winner of Miss Asia Russia 2018.
 (#6) Nina Kant Mandal was 2nd Runner Up of Miss Universe Nepal 2020. 
 (#7) Sujita Basnet was the winner of Miss Nepal USA 2011 and became the first ever winner of Miss Nepal USA. 
 (#8) Sujita Basnet was one of the winners of Miss Maryland World 2016.
 (#9) Sujita Basnet was one of the Top 12 semifinalists in Miss World America 2016.
 (#10) Sujita Basnet was 1st Runner Up of Miss Universe Nepal 2020. 
 (#11) Keshu Khadka was the winner of Republica Miss Teen 2012.
 (#12) Rakchya Upreti was a Top 7 Finalist in Miss Nepal 2019.

References

External links
Miss Universe Nepal Website

Beauty pageants in Nepal
2021 beauty pageants
2021 in Nepal